The 1949 Commonwealth Prime Ministers' Conference was the fourth meeting of the Heads of government of the Commonwealth of Nations. It was held in the United Kingdom in April 1949 and was hosted by that country's prime minister, Clement Attlee.

The principal topic of the conference was the relationship of India, which was intending to become a republic, to the Commonwealth, which, hitherto, had been an association of Britain and British dominions united by sharing a constitutional link by sharing the British sovereign as their head of state, in particular whether a Commonwealth state could become a republic and remain in the Commonwealth, if so, whether it had the same status in the Commonwealth as the dominions who had the British sovereign as their head of state. The Canadian government feared that if India was not permitted to remain in the Commonwealth as an autonomous republic then Pakistan, Ceylon, and South Africa would soon leave as well, resulting in the Commonwealth's collapse. Australian prime minister Ben Chifley was on one pole during the conference, arguing for maintaining a strong British connection, while South Africa's newly elected nationalist prime minister, D. F. Malan, was on the other pole arguing for complete independence.

In the London Declaration, Commonwealth prime ministers agreed to India's continued membership in the Commonwealth as a republic and that the King would have a new role in the Commonwealth not as a joint head of state but as "the symbol of the free association of its member nations, and as such Head of the Commonwealth."

Four days before the Conference met, Ireland formally declared itself a republic. The other members of the Commonwealth chose to regard that declaration as terminating Ireland's membership of the Commonwealth. Ireland had not participated in Commonwealth affairs since the 1930s but this was the first conference to be held after Ireland's membership was regarded as terminated.

Participants

References 

1949
Diplomatic conferences in the United Kingdom
20th-century diplomatic conferences
1949 in international relations
1949 in London
United Kingdom and the Commonwealth of Nations
1949 conferences
April 1949 events in the United Kingdom
Clement Attlee
Lester B. Pearson
Jawaharlal Nehru
Liaquat Ali Khan